Robert Byrd Whigham (June 13, 1933 – October 22, 2017) was an American minor league baseball player and college football coach. He served as the head football coach at Troy State University—now known as Troy University—from 1974 to 1975.

Head coaching record

College

References

External links
 
 

1933 births
2017 deaths
American men's basketball players
Baseball pitchers
Guards (basketball)
Auburn Tigers baseball players
Auburn Tigers football coaches
Auburn Tigers men's basketball players
Georgia Bulldogs football coaches
Graceville Oilers players
Troy Trojans football coaches
High school football coaches in Florida
People from Louisville, Alabama
Baseball players from Alabama
Basketball players from Alabama